WEZW (93.1 FM) is an FM radio station based in Wildwood Crest, New Jersey and serving the Ocean City, Cape May and Atlantic City markets. Its studios are located at the Bayport One complex in West Atlantic City, and its transmitter is located in Wildwood, New Jersey. The station is owned by Equity Communications, LP and plays an oldies format.

History
93.1 was granted the WDOX calls on May 17, 1990 (at the time, standing for original CP holder David Oxenford). The station went on the air in August 1993 with an easy listening format, using the slogan "The Docks." This ultimately lasted for only 9 months and then in May 1994 became an alternative rock station.

On March 1, 1999, calls were changed to WBNJ and 93.1 began to simulcast the Urban AC format of WTTH, 96.1 in Margate City, following the transfer of the station to Margate Communications.

On October 16, 2003 the station changed its call sign to WDTH, following its sale from Margate Communications to Equity Communications in March, 2002.

On September 15, 2006, the call letters were changed to the current WEZW. Until 2004 the WEZW calls were on WJZN, an adult standards station in Augusta, Maine. WEZW were also the former calls of what is now top 40 station WXSS in Milwaukee, Wisconsin, when that station played beautiful music in the 1970s, 1980s and 1990s.

In late October 2009, WEZW ended its simulcast of WTTH and started a Christmas music format. The format ended on December 28 of that year, and the station became Easy 93.1, airing a Soft AC format. In 2010, the station was added to the Philadelphia Phillies Radio Network.

On October 17, 2011, WEZW became the first station in the United States to change over to Christmas music for the 2011 holiday season. It was again first in 2014, flipping again on the 17th, and the first for 2017, flipping on October 20, 2017. In response to the 2014 change, WEZW described its choice to flip to Christmas so early each year as a way to build notoriety for the weak-signaled station, which has an older and more conservative listener base.

On August 6, 2019, WEZW flipped to a simulcast of Classic Oldies WMID right after the broadcast of a Phillies game. With this format change, the station also became an affiliate of The Rush Limbaugh Show. The soft AC format continued to stream online until late September.

On Saturdays, the station simulcasts the popular "Bob Pantano Saturday Night Dance Party" from Philadelphia's 98.1 WOGL.

References

External links

EZW
WEZW
Radio stations established in 1990